Todd Nelson may refer to:

Todd Nelson (ice hockey) (born 1969), former Canadian ice hockey player
Todd Nelson (tennis) (born 1961), American former professional tennis player
Todd S. Nelson, American CEO of three for-profit college chains